The 2017 COSAFA Under-17 Championship is the 6th edition of the COSAFA U-17 Championship, an association football tournament organised by the Council of Southern Africa Football Associations (COSAFA) involving teams from Southern Africa for players aged 17 and below. It will take place in Mauritius in July 2017.

Participating teams

Draw

The group stage draw took place on 15 June 2017.

Venues

Group stage

Group A

Group B

Knockout stage

Semi-finals

Third place playoff

Final

Goalscorers

5 Goals

Banda
Njobvu

3 Goals

Maonga
Nare
Shahabodien

2 Goals

Bogosi
Hakwiya
Mitraille
Mwaungulu
Tsamba
Tshobeni

1 Goal

Aristide
Balakasi
Benza
Chiu Chung Fat
Da Silva
Dillan
Geny
Gerson
Jamisse
Luis
Mamisoa
Mamitina
Mbeta
McFarlane
Mumba
P. Mumba
Philibert
Phiri
Ramatlo
Stéphan
Tauyatswala
Titani
Willard

References 

COSAFA Under-17 Championship
2017 in African football
Cos
International association football competitions hosted by Mauritius